Christian Bösiger (also spelled Boesiger, born 22 March 1984) is a Swiss male badminton player from Olten club. He competed at the 2008 Summer Olympics in the men's singles event, and reach the second round. Bösiger is a 12-time national champion.

Career
Boesiger played the 2007 BWF World Championships in men's singles, and was defeated in the first round by Yousuke Nakanishi, of Japan, 21–16, 14–21, 21–18. At the 2008 Summer Olympics, he was defeated in the second round by Przemysław Wacha of Poland with the score 12–21, 21–11, 19–21.

References

External links
 
 
 

Living people
1984 births
People from Olten
Swiss male badminton players
Badminton players at the 2008 Summer Olympics
Olympic badminton players of Switzerland
Sportspeople from the canton of Solothurn